Udagama Kanda, a mountain in Sri Lanka, situated in Padukka Division, Colombo district, Western Province. It is the highest mountain in the district reaching a height of 1492 feet above sea level. The Labugama and Kalatuwawa reservoirs are also situated in the same mountain range. The mountain is mainly covered by Labugama - Kalatuwawa Forest Strict Reserve which is roughly the catchment area of the said reservoirs and is home to wild cats, foxes, deer, sambhur, wild boar, wild hare and porcupines. The village of Udagama is also on the slopes of the mountain.

Mountains of Sri Lanka
Landforms of Colombo District